"Under the Blasted Oak"  is a comic song written by George Formby and Frederick E. Cliffe. Formby recorded it on 11 October 1942 for Regal Zonophone Records. It tells a humorous "ghost story" about the  attempts of Formby and his girlfriend to find a buried stash of money, hidden by a miser under a blasted Oak Tree. The miser makes an apparently ghostly appearance, only to turn out to be wearing a bed sheet.

The song features in Formby's 1943 film Get Cracking.

References

Bibliography
 Gammond, Peter. The Oxford Companion to Popular Music. Oxford University Press, 1991. 
 Richards, Jeffrey. The Age of the Dream Palace. I.B. Tauris, 2010. 

British songs
1942 songs
George Formby songs
Songs written by George Formby
Songs written by Fred E. Cliffe